The Subtle Art of Not Giving a F*ck: A Counterintuitive Approach to Living a Good Life is a 2016 nonfiction self-help book by American blogger and author Mark Manson. The book covers Manson's belief that life's struggles give it meaning and argues that typical self-help books offer meaningless positivity which is neither practical nor helpful, thus improperly approaching the problems many individuals face. It was a New York Times and Globe and Mail bestseller.

Publication history

The Subtle Art of Not Giving a F*ck was published under the imprint of HarperOne, a division of HarperCollins Publishers, and was released on September 13, 2016.

As of May 2019, over 8 million copies of the book had been sold.

Contents

The book is a reaction to the self-help industry and what Manson saw as a culture of mindless positivity that is not practical or helpful for most people. Manson uses many of his own personal experiences to illustrate how life's struggles often give it more meaning, which, he argues, is a better approach than constantly trying to be happy. Manson's approach and writing style have been categorized by some as contrarian to the general self-help industry, using blunt honesty and profanity to illustrate his ideas.

The book has nine chapters. The first chapter, Don't Try, is named after the philosophy of Charles Bukowski, who served as a major inspiration for the whole book.

The chapters have the following titles:

1. Don't Try.

2. Happiness is a problem.

3. You are not special.

4. The value of suffering.

5. You are always choosing.

6. You are wrong about everything (But so am I).

7. Failure is the way forward.

8. The importance of saying no.

9. And then you die.

Summary 
The Subtle Art of Not Giving a F*ck argues that individuals should seek to find meaning through what they find to be important and only engage in values that they can control. Values (such as popularity) that are not under a person's control, are, according to the book, 'bad values'. Furthermore, individuals should strive to replace these uncontrollable values with things they have the capability to change, such as punctuality, honesty, or kindness. Manson further cautions against claiming certainty about knowledge that is out of one's grasp, especially in the case of attempting to leave a legacy. Meaning can be found, Manson claims, when one seeks to create joy in the moment for one's self and those around as opposed to being concerned with building a body of work as a legacy.

Reception

The Subtle Art of Not Giving a F*ck first appeared on the New York Times Bestseller List at #6 for the category of How-to and Miscellaneous for the week of October 2, 2016. It reached #1 for the first time on July 16, 2017. As of the end of May 2020, the book has spent 179 weeks on the New York Times Bestseller list.

The book also appeared on the Washington Post Bestseller List at #9 in the Non-fiction/General category for the week of September 25, 2016, and on the Toronto Star List at #1 in the Self-Improvement category on September 23, 2016. In 2017, it was the best-selling nonfiction book from Barnes & Noble, the #4 best-selling book on all of Amazon.com, and the #9 best-selling book in Canada.

Kirkus Reviews said that the book was "[a] good yardstick by which self-improvement books should be measured."

The book was noted as a prominent instance of an industry wide trend of swear words in book titles during the 2010s.

Critics have been quick to note that the apparent lack of sophistication in language and style of the book is a clever disguise for more serious value-related content of the book.

References

External links

 Mark Manson – Official Website

Self-help books
2016 non-fiction books
English-language books
HarperOne books